Leminen is a Finnish surname. Notable people with the surname include:

 Hannu Leminen (1910–1997), Finnish film director, set designer, screenwriter, and broadcasting executive
 Markus Leminen (born 1995), Finnish figure skater and coach

Finnish-language surnames